Júnior Jader Fell (born 10 April 1992 in Estrela) is a Brazilian professional footballer who plays as a centre-back for Nacional de Muriaé.

Career
He began his career playing for the Under-20 sides of the Brazilian clubs Metropolitano and Vasco da Gama. His senior career started in 2013 in Metropolitano, and in that same year he played, on loan, for Ferencváros, a Hungarian League member.

In 2014, back to Metropolitano, he was elected by Globoesporte.com as one of the ten best new players in the Brazilian state leagues of that season. Later that year, in October, he signed with Atlético Paranaense.

In 2015, Júnior Fell played for Foz do Iguaçu and Inter de Lages, on loan in both cases.

References

External links

FTC Official Site Profile

1992 births
Living people
Brazilian footballers
Brazilian expatriate footballers
Association football defenders
Clube Atlético Metropolitano players
CR Vasco da Gama players
Esporte Clube Internacional de Lages players
Ferencvárosi TC footballers
Club Athletico Paranaense players
Foz do Iguaçu Futebol Clube players
Roasso Kumamoto players
FC Cascavel players
Grêmio Esportivo Juventus players
Grêmio Esportivo Glória players
Nemzeti Bajnokság I players
J2 League players
Campeonato Brasileiro Série D players
Expatriate footballers in Hungary
Expatriate footballers in Japan
Brazilian expatriate sportspeople in Hungary
Brazilian expatriate sportspeople in Japan